ERM (Environmental Resources Management) is a multinational consultancy firm which focuses on sustainability. It is headquartered in London, United Kingdom. The company provides environmental, health, safety, risk, and social consulting services and sustainability related services. ERM has 5,500 employees based in over 40 countries.

History
ERM Limited was formed in 1987, through the merger of two companies: the UK-based consultancy firm ERL, which was founded in 1971; and the USA-based consultancy firm ERM, which was founded in 1977. The company has since grown through various acquisitions. OMERS and AIMCo purchased a majority stake in ERM from Charterhouse Capital Partners in 2015. In 2021 the majority stake in the company was purchased from OMERS and AIMCo by American global investment company KKR, valuing the company at around $2.7 billion including debt. A minority stake continues to be held by ERM partners.

In January 2022, ERM announced the appointment of Tom Reichert as CEO of ERM Group, effective 1 February 2022.

Projects
In the 2010s, a consortium led by ERM won the environmental impact assessment work for part of the HS2 construction work in the United Kingdom. Other consortum members included Mott MacDonald and Temple Group.

In 2019, ERM received funding from the UK government for Project Dolphyn, a project focused on green hydrogen production from offshore wind power.

References

External links

1987 establishments in England
Consulting firms established in 1987
International management consulting firms
Privately held companies of the United Kingdom
Sustainability organizations
2021 mergers and acquisitions